Pohle is a municipality in Lower Saxony, Germany. It may also refer to:

People
Andreas Pohle (1981), German athlete
Christian Nikolai Richard Pohle (1869-1926), German botanist
David Pohle (1624–1695), German composer

Other
Pohle's Fruit Bat, an African megabat

See also
Pohl (disambiguation)
Pole (disambiguation)
Poll (disambiguation)

Ethnonymic surnames